Roncà is a comune (township) in the Province of Verona in the Italian region Veneto, located about  west of Venice and about  east of Verona.

The municipality of Roncà contains the frazione (subdivision) Terrossa, S. Margherita and Brenton.

Roncà borders the following municipalities: Arzignano, Chiampo, Gambellara, Montebello Vicentino, Montecchia di Crosara, Montorso Vicentino, and San Giovanni Ilarione.

Demographic evolution

Twin towns
Roncà is twinned with:

  Wackernheim, Germany, since 2000

References

See also
Durello (wine)

Cities and towns in Veneto